Esther Ballestrino (20 January 1918 – disappeared 17 or 18 December 1977) was a Paraguayan biochemist and political activist. She is most notable for her connection to the future Pope Francis and her forced disappearance (abduction and murder) in Argentina by the military dictatorship of the National Reorganization Process (1976–1983). She had helped found Mothers of the Plaza de Mayo, which organised protests by the mothers of missing children taken by the authorities.

Life
Ballestrino was born in Paraguay, where she obtained a doctorate in biochemistry. She became politically active as a member of the socialist February Revolutionary Party; she later founded and led the Women's Movement of Paraguay. Politics was dangerous under the military rule of Higinio Morínigo, and she had to leave the country in 1947. In Argentina she married and had three daughters. She worked in the foods section at Hickethier-Bachmann Laboratory in Buenos Aires, where one of her subordinates was Jorge Mario Bergoglio, who would later become Pope Francis. He remembers working for her and her attention to detail. He later commented that Marxists could be good people and he saw Ballestrino as a major influence on him. Ballestrino is said to be the first woman to be the boss of a future pope.

In 1976 two of her sons in law, Manuel Carlos Cuevas and Ives Domergue, were kidnapped and they disappeared. Ballestrino was credited with helping found the Mothers of the Plaza de Mayo which involved the mothers of missing children protesting at the Plaza de Mayo. The next year, her pregnant daughter Ana Maria Careaga was also abducted in December 1977 by the authorities and tortured. Ballestrino contacted her associate, Jorge Mario Bergoglio, and asked that he come to give the last rites to a relative. The Catholic Bergoglio was surprised, as he knew that Ballestrino was a Marxist. When he arrived, he learned that Ballestrino's real intention was to have him smuggle out the family's collection of communist books. Ballestrino was worried that these books would lead to her arrest in the case of a house search. Bergoglio did as he was requested and smuggled out the books.

In December 1977, Ballestrino, Sisters Alice and Léonie, along with other Mothers of the Plaza de Mayo, prepared a request for the names of those who disappeared and for the government to divulge their whereabouts. The reply was publicized in the newspaper La Nación on December 10, 1977. Navy captain Alfredo Astiz had infiltrated the Mothers of the Plaza de Mayo, and the authorities moved against the ringleaders. Ballestrino and María Ponce de Bianco were seized by the security forces in the Church of Santa Cruz in downtown Buenos Aires.

The women were taken to a detention centre by the Argentine security services, where they were tortured and then dropped into the sea from an aircraft whilst presumably still living.

Search for remains
On December 20, 1977, corpses were discovered near the bathing areas of Santa Teresita and Mar del Tuyú. Forensic investigations determined the cause of death to be "a crash against hard objects from great heights". This was concluded from the type of bone fractures that were sustained before death. Without further investigation, the bodies were placed in unmarked graves in the cemetery of the city of General Lavalle. They were to remain there for some time.

The National Commission on the Disappearance of Persons and the Trial of the Juntas led in 1984 to the exhumation of bodies in the General Lavalle cemetery. The investigations revealed bones that had belonged to the bodies found on the San Bernardo and La Lucila del Mar beaches. This evidence was used in the trial against the Juntas by Judge Horacio Cattani. It was not until 2003 that further information led to more exhumations by the Argentine Forensic Anthropology Team, which identified the eight bodies, including five women who had disappeared in 1977: Ballestrino, Azucena Villaflor, María Ponce de Bianco, Angela Auad, and Sister Léonie Duquet.

The enactment of Argentine laws known as Ley de Punto Final and Ley de Obediencia Debida put an end to further investigation, as there was now an assumption that those involved were following orders. Cattani had evidence that was described as "40 square meters" in 1995.

All the bodies were reburied in the garden of the Santa Cruz church. The remains of Sister Alice Domon were not found and remain missing.

Knowledge by the United States government 
Documents from the United States government, declassified in 2002, show that the American government knew in 1978 that the bodies of the French nuns Alice Domon and Léonie Duquet, and the Madres de Plaza de Mayo Azucena Villaflor, Esther Ballestrino, and María Ponce, had been found on the beaches of Buenos Aires Province. This secret was revealed in Document #1978-BUENOS-02346, prepared by the former U.S. Ambassador to Argentina, Raúl Castro, for the United States Secretary of State. It was dated March 30, 1978, and carried the subject line, "Report of nuns death". The document reads:

1. A.F.P. March 28 story filed from Paris reports that the bodies of the two French nuns (Alicia Doman and Renee Duguet) (sic) who were abducted in mid December with eleven other human rights activists were identified among corpses near Bahía Blanca.

2. Buenos Aires was filled with such rumors over a month ago based on accounts of the discovery of a number of cadavers beached by unusually strong winds along Atlantic Sea, points closer to the mouth of La Plata River some 300-350 miles to the north of Bahía Blanca.

3. (Name redacted), which has been trying to track down these rumors, has confidential information that the nuns were abducted by Argentine security agents and at some point were transferred to a prison located in the town of Junín, which is 150 miles west of Buenos Aires.

4. Embassy also has confidential information through an Argentine government source (protected) that seven bodies were discovered some weeks ago on the beach near Mar del Plata. According to this source, the bodies were those of the two nuns and five mothers who disappeared between December 8 and December 10, 1977. Our source confirmed that these individuals were originally sequestered by members of the security forces acting under a broad mandate against terrorists and subversives. Source further states that few individuals in GOA were aware of this information.

5. The source has reported reliably in the past and we have reason to believe he is reliable concerning disappearance questions.

Legacy
In 2014 Pope Francis met with Ballestrino's husband, who lives in exile in Sweden.

References 

1918 births
1977 deaths
Argentine biochemists
Argentine feminists
Argentine human rights activists
Assassinated activists
People killed in the Dirty War
Victims murdered by being dropped out of an aircraft
Uruguayan emigrants to Argentina